Pseudolaguvia ferruginea is a species of sisorid catfish from the Raidak River, which is a tributary of the Sankosh River, which is in turn a tributary of the Brahmaputra River in India.

References

Catfish of Asia
Fish of India
Taxa named by Heok Hee Ng
Fish described in 2009
Erethistidae